Margarita Abella Caprile (August 5, 1901 – October 28, 1960) was an Argentine writer. Born in Buenos Aires, she was the daughter of Eduardo Abella and Margarita Caprile Mitre; and the great-granddaughter of General Bartolomé Mitre. She attended Colegio del Sagrado Corazon, Buenos Aires.
Although she worked as a journalist and wrote travel books, novels, and short stories, she is known primarily as a poet.  Since 1955, she replaced Eduardo Mallea as director of the literary supplement of the newspaper La Nación, where she worked until her death. Her contemporaries included Alfonsina Storni, Gabriela Mistral, Delmira Agustini, and Juana de Ibarbourou.

Selected works
Ensayos (1917)
Nieve (1919)
Perfiles en la niebla (1923)
Sonetos (1931)
Geografías (1936)
50 Poesías (1938)
Sombras en el mar (1941)
Lo miré con lágrimas (1950)
El árbol derribado (1959)

See also
 Lists of writers

References

External links

1901 births
1960 deaths
Writers from Buenos Aires
Argentine women novelists
Argentine women poets
Argentine women journalists
Argentine women short story writers
20th-century Argentine women writers
20th-century Argentine writers
20th-century Argentine novelists
20th-century Argentine poets
20th-century short story writers